Saint Nerses the Great Church of New Julfa, (Armenian: ,), is an Armenian Apostolic church in New Julfa, Iran. It is located in Kocher neighbourhood of New Julfa, next to the Catholic Church of Our Lady of the Rosary.

History 

Saint Minas Church was built in 1666 by Avetis Gilanian. After devotion of relic of St. Nerses to this church, it was renamed to St. Nerses Church. 
The church belfry was built in 1889. There are several tombstones in the courtyard, including 11 belonging Georgians with Armenian and Georgian inscriptions.

See also
Iranian Armenians
List of Armenian churches in Iran

References 

Architecture in Iran
Churches in Isfahan
Armenian Apostolic churches in Iran
Oriental Orthodox congregations established in the 17th century
Tourist attractions in Isfahan